Singsås is a village in Midtre Gauldal municipality in Trøndelag county, Norway. The Norwegian County Road 30 and the Rørosbanen railway line both pass through the village. The village of Haltdalen lies about  up the valley to the east and the village of Rognes lies about  down the valley to the west. Singsås Station is located in the centre part of the village while Singsås Church lies along the river, just west of the village at Fordsetmoen. There is a Coop store in Singsås.

History
From 1841 until 1964, the area surrounding the village was the municipality of Singsås and during this time, the village of Singsås was the administrative centre of that municipality.

References

Midtre Gauldal
Villages in Trøndelag